The 2021 Virginia Tech Hokies men's soccer team represented Virginia Tech during the 2021 NCAA Division I men's soccer season. It was be the 50th season of the University fielding a program.  The Hokies played their home games at Sandra D. Thompson Field in Blacksburg, Virginia.  The Hokies were led by thirteenth-year head coach Mike Brizendine.

The Hokies finished the season 11–5–4 overall and 3–4–1 in ACC play to finish fifth in the Coastal Division.  As the eighth overall seed in the ACC Tournament, they defeated ninth seed Boston College in the First Round before losing to top seeded Pittsburgh in the Quarterfinals.  They received an at-large bid to the NCAA Tournament.  They defeated Campbell in the First Round before losing to West Virginia in a penalty shoot-out to end their season.

Previous season 

The teams' 2020 season was significantly impacted by the COVID-19 pandemic, which curtailed the fall season and caused the NCAA Tournament to be played in Spring 2021. The ACC was one of the only two conferences in men's soccer to play in the fall of 2020.  The ACC also held a mini-season during the spring of 2021.

The Hokies finished the fall season 3–2–2 and 3–1–2 in ACC play to finish in second place in the North Division.  In the ACC Tournament they lost to Clemson in the Quarterfinals.  They finished the spring season 4–4–2 and 2–4–0 in ACC play, to finish in fifth place in the Coastal Division.  They received an at-large bid to the NCAA Tournament.  They defeated Oregon State in the Second Round before losing to the number six seed Seton Hall in the Third Round to end their season.

In the 2021 MLS SuperDraft, the Hokies had two players drafted:Daniel Periera and Kristofer Strickler.

Player movement

Players leaving

Players arriving

Squad

Roster

Team management 

Source:

Schedule 

Source:

|-
!colspan=6 style=""| Exhibition

|-
!colspan=6 style=""| Regular season

|-
!colspan=6 style=""| ACC Tournament

|-
!colspan=6 style=""| NCAA Tournament

Honors and awards

Rankings

2022 MLS SuperDraft 

Source:

References

External links 
 Virginia Tech Men's Soccer

2021
Virginia Tech Hokies
Virginia Tech Hokies
Virginia Tech Hokies men's soccer
Virginia Tech